The 2001 New Zealand local elections were triennial elections to select local government officials. The elections are notable for being the inaugural elections for district health board members. The elections were held on Saturday, 13 October, as prescribed in the Local Electoral Act 2001.

Election date
The Local Electoral Act 2001 received ascent in May 2001. It stipulated under section 10 that "the next triennial general election of members of every local authority and community board is on 13 October 2001" and furthermore, that "a general election of members of every local authority, local board, or community board must be held on the second Saturday in October in every third year" thereafter.

Voting system
The 2001 local elections were the last occasion when first-past-the-post voting (FPP) was used exclusively. From the 2004 elections onwards, territorial authorities and regional councils could choose between FPP and the single transferable vote (STV) method. District health board elections had to use STV from 2004 and were changed to at-large elections.

District health boards
District health boards (DHBs) were established in January 2001 through the New Zealand Public Health and Disability Act 2000. At that time, the 21 DHBs had their boards appointed by the Minister of Health, Annette King. Each board has up to eleven members and seven of those are elected in local elections. As defined in section 7 of the Local Electoral Act 2001, board members for DHBs are to be elected as part of the local elections. The 2001 local elections were thus the inaugural elections for the country's then 21 DHBs. Elections were based on candidacies in local wards.

Results

Mayoral elections
Around 34 of the country's 74 mayoralties changed through the 2001 elections. The most notable contest happened in Auckland City, where John Banks ousted Christine Fletcher. Other cities that had their mayors unseated were Hamilton (David Braithwaite defeated Russ Rimmington) and Palmerston North (Mark Bell-Booth defeated Jill White). In Invercargill, Tim Shadbolt was returned unopposed.

Other outcomes
Of those who stood for election, 18 percent were declared elected unopposed. Spoiled votes made up 4.1 percent of the total votes.

See also
 List of chairpersons of district health boards

References

Local 2001
Local elections
October 2001 events in New Zealand